B-414 Daniil Moskovsky was a Project 671RTM Schuka (NATO: Victor III) attack submarine of the Russian Northern Fleet. The submarine was laid down in 1989, launched and commissioned in 1990. It was known as K-414 before renaming in 1992. In 1994 B-414 took part in joint combat service with SSBN  of the Delta IV class. In 1996 the submarine was named after Prince Daniil Moskovsky, the youngest son of Alexander Nevsky.

On 6 September 2006, a fire broke out on board killing two sailors.

On 18 November 2012, while reportedly engaged in routine "combat training" in the Barents Sea the submarine responded to a distress call and rescued two fisherman when their boat began sinking off the coast of the Kola Peninsula, reported to be somewhere between Liinakhamari and Teriberka. A spokesperson for the Russian Navy's Northern Fleet said the rescue was accomplished despite adverse weather conditions.

In 2019 it was reported that the Daniil Moskovsky would be retired by the end of 2021. However, the boat's status remained unclear as of January 2022. It was shown at dockside during a Combat Approved documentary in January 2022. The boat was reportedly decommissioned on 28 October 2022 and subsequently towed for scrapping.

References

External links
 

Victor-class submarines
Ships built in the Soviet Union
1990 ships
Cold War submarines of the Soviet Union
Submarines of Russia
Ships of the Russian Northern Fleet
Russian submarine accidents